Anitta may refer to:

Anitta (king), Hittite king
Anitta (singer) (born 1993), Brazilian singer
Anitta Müller-Cohen (1890–1962), Austrian-born Israeli social worker, politician and writer

See also
Anita (disambiguation)